The list of shipwrecks in July 1885 includes ships sunk, foundered, grounded, or otherwise lost during July 1885.

1 July

3 July

4 July

6 July

8 July

11 July

13 July

14 July

15 July

16 July

17 July

18 July

19 July

21 July

22 July

23 July

26 July

28 July

31 July

Unknown date

References

1885-07
Maritime incidents in July 1885